General elections were held in Ecuador on 5 June 1960. The presidential election was won by José María Velasco Ibarra of the National Velasquista Federation, who received 48.2% of the vote. His fourth term of office began on 1 September.

Results

President

References

Elections in Ecuador
1960 in Ecuador
Ecuador
Election and referendum articles with incomplete results